Sergeant Sam Gloade (Glode), DCM (April 20, 1878 – October 25, 1957) was a decorated Mi'kmaq soldier from Milton, Nova Scotia.  He served in World War I and was awarded the Distinguished Conduct Medal, the British War Medal and the Victory Medal.  He trained first with the 64th Battalion, CEF, an infantry reinforcement holding unit in England, and then joined the 1st Canadian Tunnelling Company, Canadian Engineers. Sam was in the Battle of Messines (1917).  He reported:

Late that afternoon the German artillery on Messines Ridge began to shell our trench and kept it up for a long time.  They scared us bad, I tell you.  We were all green hands, and we would leave our rifles and run along the trench away from shell burst. Then another shell would burst near us and we would run down the trench again.  Some fellows got hit and they hollered and there was a lot of blood.
He dug trenches under Vimy Ridge, patched roadways near Amiens and defused mines after the war.  On one occasion, he was in charge of 20 soldiers who got trapped underground.  He is credited with having single-handedly dug for hours before he was able to burrow a hole to the surface. He worked from the La Clytte Camp (close to Ypres in Belgium) for over a year.  Glode was also in the Battle of Passchendaele and Battle of Amiens (1918).
Gloade is buried in the St. Gregory's Roman Catholic Church Cemetery, Milton, Nova Scotia. His son Louis was a member of the Nova Scotia Highlanders and was wounded by a piece of shrapnel.

See also 
Military history of Nova Scotia
Military history of the Mi’kmaq people
Tunnelling companies of the Royal Engineers

References 

1878 births
1957 deaths
20th-century First Nations people
Canadian Army
Canadian engineers
Canadian military personnel from Nova Scotia
Royal Canadian Engineers soldiers
Canadian Expeditionary Force soldiers
Mi'kmaq people
People from Queens County, Nova Scotia
Canadian recipients of the Distinguished Conduct Medal
Tunnel warfare in World War I